Daniel Hubert Barrow, Jr. (July 22, 1909 – November 4, 1993) was an American rower who competed in the 1936 Summer Olympics.

Oldest of Elizabeth Stewart Barrow and Daniel H. Barrow's 12 children.

One of the young men recruited out of West Philadelphia Catholic High School by Jack Kelly Sr. (three time Olympic Gold medal winning rower and father of actress Grace Kelly) who made up the Pennsylvania Athletic Club's "Big Eight". This Penn AC crew, which, besides Dan Barrow, included Chester Turner, Joe Dougherty, Myrlin Janes, John McNichol, Jack Bratten, Tom Curran & Charley McIlvaine along with coxswain Tom Mack were undefeated in all of their 31 races between 1928 & 1932. A notable victory included winning the 1930 FISA world rowing championship in Leige, Belgium by two boat lengths after breaking the world record for 2,000 meters in an earlier heat.

In 1936 he won the bronze medal in the single sculls competition. Despite rowing in a much heavier boat (European rowers used newer, lighter, sculls), Dan initially was rowing in second place, however his boat was bumped by the boat of another rower and he lost ground, falling back to fourth place. He was able to regain enough ground in the time remaining to win the Bronze Medal.

Inducted into the West Catholic High School Athletic Hall of Fame.

External links
 profile

1909 births
1993 deaths
Rowers at the 1936 Summer Olympics
Olympic bronze medalists for the United States in rowing
American male rowers
Medalists at the 1936 Summer Olympics